The  Sutta (Pali) or  (Sanskrit), is traditionally recorded as the second discourse delivered by Gautama Buddha. The title translates to the "Not-Self Characteristic Discourse", but is also known as the Pañcavaggiya Sutta (Pali) or Pañcavargīya Sūtra (Skt.), meaning the "Group of Five" Discourse.

Contents 
In this discourse, the Buddha analyzes the constituents of a person's body and mind (khandha) and demonstrates that they are each impermanent (anicca), subject to suffering (dukkha) and thus unfit for identification with a "self" (attan). The Pali version of this discourse reads:

"Form, ... feeling, ... perception, ... [mental] fabrications, ... consciousness is not self. If consciousness were the self, this consciousness would not lend itself to dis-ease. It would be possible [to say] with regard to consciousness, 'Let my consciousness be thus. Let my consciousness not be thus.' But precisely because consciousness is not self, consciousness lends itself to dis-ease. And it is not possible [to say] with regard to consciousness, 'Let my consciousness be thus. Let my consciousness not be thus.'...

"Thus, monks, any form, ... feeling, ... perception, ... fabrications, ... consciousness whatsoever that is past, future, or present; internal or external; blatant or subtle; common or sublime; far or near: every consciousness is to be seen as it actually is with right discernment as: 'This is not mine. This is not my self. This is not what I am.'

"Seeing thus, the well-instructed disciple of the noble ones grows disenchanted with form, disenchanted with feeling, disenchanted with perception, disenchanted with fabrications, disenchanted with consciousness. Disenchanted, he becomes dispassionate. Through dispassion, he is fully released. With full release, there is the knowledge, 'Fully released.' He discerns that 'Birth is ended, the holy life fulfilled, the task done. There is nothing further for this world.'"

In Buddhist canons 
In the Pali Canon, the Anattalakkhana Sutta is found in the Samyutta Nikaya ("Connected Collection," abbreviated as either "SN" or "S") and is designated by either "SN 21.59" (SLTP) or "SN 22.59" (CSCD) or "S iii 66" (PTS). This discourse is also found in the Buddhist monastic code (Vinaya).

In the Chinese set of Āgamas, this discourse can be found as Saṃyukta Āgama 34, or "SA 34".

A version of this sutra, called the Aṇatvalakṣaṇa Sutra, is found among the Gāndhārī Buddhist Texts attributed to the Dharmaguptaka sect.

See also
 Dhammacakkappavattana Sutta
 Anattā (Pali; Skt.: anātman; Eng.: "non-self")
 Three marks of existence: impermanence (anicca), suffering (dukkha) and non-self (anattā).
 Skandha (Skt.; Pali: khandha; Eng.: "aggregate") – Buddhist categories of body-mind constituents.

Notes

Sources

 Chaṭṭha Sagāyana CD (CSCD) (n.d.), "Khandhasaṃyuttaṃ" (SN 22). Retrieved 2010-12-29 from "The Pali Tipitaka" at http://tipitaka.org/romn/cscd/s0303m.mul0.xml.
 Mendis, N.K.G. (tr., ed.) (1979). On the No-self Characteristic: The Anatta-lakkhana Sutta (The Wheel No. 268). Kandy: Buddhist Publication Society. Retrieved 2007-10-03 from "Access to Insight" (2007) at http://www.accesstoinsight.org/lib/authors/mendis/wheel268.html.
 Ñanamoli Thera (tr., ed.) (1981). Three Cardinal Discourses of the Buddha (The Wheel No. 17). Kandy: Buddhist Publication Society. Retrieved 2007-10-03 from "Access to Insight" (1995) at http://www.accesstoinsight.org/lib/authors/nanamoli/wheel017.html.
 Rhys Davids, T.W. & Hermann Oldenberg (tr.) (1881). Vinaya Texts. Oxford: Clarendon Press. Retrieved 26 Sep 2007 from "Internet Sacred Texts Archive" at http://www.sacred-texts.com/bud/sbe13/index.htm.
 Sri Lanka Tripitaka Project (SLTP) (n.d.), "Upayavaggo" (SN 21.6).  Retrieved 2010-12-19 from "MettaNet" at http://metta.lk/tipitaka/2Sutta-Pitaka/3Samyutta-Nikaya/Samyutta3/21-Khandha-Samyutta/02-01-Upayavaggo-p.html.
 Thanissaro Bhikkhu (tr.) (1993). Pañcavaggi Sutta: Five Brethren (SN 22.59). Retrieved 2010-12-29 from "Access to Insight" at http://www.accesstoinsight.org/tipitaka/sn/sn22/sn22.059.than.html.

External links
Translations

 The Characteristic of Nonself, translation by Bhikkhu Bodhi
 The Characteristic of Not-Self, translation by Bhikkhu Sujato
  From the Saṃyukta Āgama translated by Guṇabhadra (T02n99).
 http://www.accesstoinsight.org/tipitaka/sn/sn22/sn22.059.mend.html

Samyutta Nikaya